Albert John Banfield (5 May 1912 – q3 1970) was an English professional footballer who played as an inside forward in the Football League for Bristol City and York City and was on the books of Clapton Orient without making a league appearance.

References

1912 births
Footballers from Bristol
1970 deaths
English footballers
Association football forwards
Bristol City F.C. players
York City F.C. players
Leyton Orient F.C. players
English Football League players